Petter Stymne (born 9 May 1983 in Ryd, Sweden) is a Swedish swimmer from Skövde, representing SK Neptun from Stockholm. He competed for his native country at the 2004 Summer Olympics in Athens, Greece.

Stymne became gold medalist and world record holder in the 4×50 meters freestyle together with Stefan Nystrand, Marcus Piehl and Jonas Tilly with the time of 1:24.89 on 10 December 2006 at the European Short Course Swimming Championships in Helsinki, Finland.

Clubs
 Skövde SS
 SK Neptun

External links
 
 Profile at Sveriges Olympiska Kommitté

1983 births
Living people
Olympic swimmers of Sweden
Swimmers at the 2008 Summer Olympics
Swedish male freestyle swimmers
Medalists at the FINA World Swimming Championships (25 m)
European Aquatics Championships medalists in swimming
Skövde SS swimmers
SK Neptun swimmers
People from Skövde Municipality
Sportspeople from Västra Götaland County